The 11th parallel north is a circle of latitude that is 11 degrees north of the Earth's equatorial plane. It crosses Africa, the Indian Ocean, South Asia, Southeast Asia, the Pacific Ocean, Central America, South America and the Atlantic Ocean.

At this latitude the sun is visible for 12 hours, 46 minutes during the summer solstice and 11 hours, 29 minutes during the winter solstice.

In Thailand, a 1966 cabinet resolution restricts the rights of non-Thai companies to conduct mineral exploration or mining operations north of this parallel.

Around the world
Starting at the Prime Meridian and heading eastwards, the parallel 11° north passes through:

{| class="wikitable plainrowheaders"
! scope="col" | Co-ordinates
! scope="col" | Country, territory or sea
! scope="col" | Notes
|-
| 
! scope="row" | 
|
|-
| 
! scope="row" | 
|
|-
| 
! scope="row" | 
|
|-
| 
! scope="row" | 
|
|-
| 
! scope="row" | 
|
|-
| 
! scope="row" | 
| 
|-
| 
! scope="row" | 
|
|-
| 
! scope="row" | 
| The extreme north of the country, for about 8 km
|-
| 
! scope="row" | 
|
|-
| 
! scope="row" | 
|
|-
| 
! scope="row" | 
|
|-
| 
! scope="row" | 
|
|-
| 
! scope="row" | 
|
|-
| 
! scope="row" | 
|
|-
| 
! scope="row" | 
|
|-
| 
! scope="row" | 
|
|-
| 
! scope="row" | 
| Somaliland
|-
| style="background:#b0e0e6;" | 
! scope="row" style="background:#b0e0e6;" | Gulf of Aden
| style="background:#b0e0e6;" |
|-
| 
! scope="row" | 
| Somaliland and Puntland
|-valign="top"
| style="background:#b0e0e6;" | 
! scope="row" style="background:#b0e0e6;" | Indian Ocean
| style="background:#b0e0e6;" | Arabian SeaPassing between the islands of Bangaram and Amini in 's Lakshadweep IslandsLakshadweep Sea
|-valign="top"
| 
! scope="row" | 
| Kerala Tamil Nadu – passing through Coimbatore Puducherry: Karaikal district, for about 4 km
|-valign="top"
| style="background:#b0e0e6;" | 
! scope="row" style="background:#b0e0e6;" | Indian Ocean
| style="background:#b0e0e6;" | Bay of BengalPassing between Rutland Island and Little Andaman in 's Andaman and Nicobar IslandsAndaman Sea – passing just north of the island of Lanbi Kyun, 
|-valign="top"
| 
! scope="row" |  (Burma)
| Island of Kau-Ye Kyun, and the mainland
|-
| 
! scope="row" | 
|
|-
| style="background:#b0e0e6;" | 
! scope="row" style="background:#b0e0e6;" | Gulf of Thailand
| style="background:#b0e0e6;" |
|-
| 
! scope="row" | 
|
|-
| style="background:#b0e0e6;" | 
! scope="row" style="background:#b0e0e6;" | Bay of Kompong Som
| style="background:#b0e0e6;" |
|-
| 
! scope="row" | 
|
|-
| 
! scope="row" | 
| For about 10 km
|-
| 
! scope="row" | 
|
|-
| 
! scope="row" | 
| Passing just north of Ho Chi Minh City, through the suburb of Thủ Dầu Một
|-
| style="background:#b0e0e6;" | 
! scope="row" style="background:#b0e0e6;" | South China Sea
| style="background:#b0e0e6;" | Passing through the disputed Spratly Islands
|-
| 
! scope="row" | 
| Island of Palawan
|-
| style="background:#b0e0e6;" | 
! scope="row" style="background:#b0e0e6;" | Sulu Sea
| style="background:#b0e0e6;" | Passing amongst the Cuyo Islands, 
|-
| 
! scope="row" | 
| Island of Panay
|-
| style="background:#b0e0e6;" | 
! scope="row" style="background:#b0e0e6;" | Guimaras Strait
| style="background:#b0e0e6;" | 
|-
| 
! scope="row" | 
| Island of Negros (northernmost tip)
|-
| style="background:#b0e0e6;" | 
! scope="row" style="background:#b0e0e6;" | Visayan Sea
| style="background:#b0e0e6;" |
|-
| 
! scope="row" | 
| Island of Cebu
|-
| style="background:#b0e0e6;" | 
! scope="row" style="background:#b0e0e6;" | Camotes Sea
| style="background:#b0e0e6;" |
|-
| 
! scope="row" | 
| Island of Leyte
|-
| style="background:#b0e0e6;" | 
! scope="row" style="background:#b0e0e6;" | Pacific Ocean
| style="background:#b0e0e6;" |
|-
| 
! scope="row" | 
| Island of Manicani
|-
| style="background:#b0e0e6;" | 
! scope="row" style="background:#b0e0e6;" | Pacific Ocean
| style="background:#b0e0e6;" |
|-
| 
! scope="row" | 
| Island of Calicoan
|-valign="top"
| style="background:#b0e0e6;" | 
! scope="row" style="background:#b0e0e6;" | Pacific Ocean
| style="background:#b0e0e6;" | Passing just south of Ailinginae and Rongelap atolls,  Passing just south of Toke atoll, 
|-
| 
! scope="row" | 
|
|-
| 
! scope="row" | 
|
|-
| 
! scope="row" | 
|
|-
| 
! scope="row" | 
|
|-
| style="background:#b0e0e6;" | 
! scope="row" style="background:#b0e0e6;" | Caribbean Sea
| style="background:#b0e0e6;" |
|-
| 
! scope="row" | 
| Passing through Barranquilla 
|-
| style="background:#b0e0e6;" | 
! scope="row" style="background:#b0e0e6;" | Caribbean Sea
| style="background:#b0e0e6;" |
|-
| 
! scope="row" | 
| 
|-
| 
! scope="row" | 
|
|-
| style="background:#b0e0e6;" | 
! scope="row" style="background:#b0e0e6;" | Caribbean Sea
| style="background:#b0e0e6;" | Gulf of Venezuela
|-
| 
! scope="row" | 
|
|-
| style="background:#b0e0e6;" | 
! scope="row" style="background:#b0e0e6;" | Caribbean Sea
| style="background:#b0e0e6;" | Passing just north of La Tortuga Island, 
|-
| 
! scope="row" | 
| Isla Margarita
|-
| style="background:#b0e0e6;" | 
! scope="row" style="background:#b0e0e6;" | Caribbean Sea
| style="background:#b0e0e6;" | Passing between the islands of Trinidad and Tobago, 
|-
| style="background:#b0e0e6;" | 
! scope="row" style="background:#b0e0e6;" | Atlantic Ocean
| style="background:#b0e0e6;" | Passing just south of the Bissagos Islands, 
|-
| 
! scope="row" | 
|
|-
| 
! scope="row" | 
|
|-
| 
! scope="row" | 
|
|-
| 
! scope="row" | 
|
|-
| 
! scope="row" | 
|
|-
| 
! scope="row" | 
|
|-
| 
! scope="row" | 
| For about 8 km
|-
| 
! scope="row" | 
|
|-
| 
! scope="row" | 
|
|-
| 
! scope="row" | 
|
|-
| 
! scope="row" | 
| For about 9 km
|-
| 
! scope="row" | 
|
|-
| 
! scope="row" | 
| For about 2 km
|-
| 
! scope="row" | 
|
|-
| 
! scope="row" | 
|
|-
|}

As a border
The border between Ghana and what was then French Upper Volta (now Burkina Faso) was fixed by treaty between the French and British at the Conference of Paris in 1898, to be the 11th parallel. The border does not follow the boundary exactly, but follows it approximately, crossing over it several times.

References

See also
10th parallel north
12th parallel north

n11